Banana Island is a small island in Qatar. Its territory is crescent-shaped and is located off the coast of the capital city of Doha. It is a natural island in the Persian Gulf. Banana Island Resort Doha by Anantara was built there.

The entire structure was completed by 2015. It has diverse vegetation such as palm trees and gardens and luxurious facilities for tourists.

See also
 List of islands of Qatar

References 

Islands of Qatar